John K. Dow (1861-1961) was an American architect. He designed the NRHP-listed Coolidge–Rising House, the NRHP-listed Grace Baptist Church, and the NRHP-listed Empire State Building. With Loren L. Rand, he designed the NRHP-listed Bump Block-Bellevue House-Hawthorne Hotel. With Clarence Z. Hubbell, he designed the NRHP-listed Hutton Building. They also designed Van Doren Hall and the Veterinary Science Building on the campus of Washington State University in Pullman, Washington.

References

1861 births
1961 deaths
People from Sibley County, Minnesota
19th-century American architects
20th-century American architects